A sea monster is a mythical sea creature.

Sea Monsters or variation may refer to:

 Sea Monsters: A Prehistoric Adventure, a 2007 National Geographic 3D film
 Sea Monsters: A Prehistoric Adventure (video game) for Wii, Nintendo DS and PlayStation 2
 Sea Monsters (TV series), a BBC television documentary series
 Seamonsters, a 1991 album by The Wedding Present
 The Sea Monster, engraving by Albrecht Dürer

See also
 Caspian Sea Monster, experimental Soviet ekranoplan
 Sigmund and the Sea Monsters, American children's television series
 Sense and Sensibility and Sea Monsters, 2009 parody novel
 See Monster, Art installation in North Somerset, England
 Sea Dragon (disambiguation)
 Sea of Monsters (disambiguation)
 Water monster (disambiguation)
 Monster (disambiguation)
 Sea (disambiguation)